Jaliens is a surname. Notable people with the surname include:

Kenneth Jaliens (born 1957), Surinamese football coach, uncle of Kew
Kew Jaliens (born 1978), Dutch footballer

Dutch-language surnames